120375 Kugel, provisional designation: , is a background asteroid from the inner regions of the asteroid belt, approximately  in diameter. It was discovered on 10 August 2005, by French amateur astronomer Claudine Rinner at her Ottmarsheim Observatory  in France. The stony S/Q-type asteroid in the region of the Florian clan has a tentative rotation period of 6.9 hours. It was named after French astronomer François Kugel.

Orbit and classification 

Kugel is a non-family asteroid of the main belt's background population when applying the hierarchical clustering method to its proper orbital elements. Based on osculating Keplerian orbital elements, the asteroid has also been considered a member of the Flora family, a giant asteroid clan and the largest family of stony asteroids in the main belt.

It orbits the Sun in the inner asteroid belt at a distance of 1.8–2.8 AU once every 3 years and 6 months (1,289 days; semi-major axis of 2.32 AU). Its orbit has an eccentricity of 0.22 and an inclination of 3° with respect to the ecliptic.

Naming 

This minor planet was named after French amateur astronomer François Kugel (born 1959), an active observer of comets and a collaborator of the discoverer. He has founded the Chante-Perdrix Observatory  in 2005. The official  was published by the Minor Planet Center on 6 August 2009.

Physical characteristics 

In the SDSS-based taxonomy, Kugel has an SQ-type that transitions between the common S-type and less common Q-type asteroids.

Rotation period 

In August 2012, a rotational lightcurve of Kugel was obtained from photometric observations in the R-band by astronomers at the Palomar Transient Factory in California. Lightcurve analysis gave a tentative rotation period of  hours with a weak brightness amplitude of 0.09 magnitude. As of 2021, no secure period has been obtained.

Diameter and albedo 

Kugel has not been observed by any of the space-based surveys such as the NEOWISE mission of NASA's Wide-field Infrared Survey Explorer, the Akari satellite or IRAS. The Collaborative Asteroid Lightcurve Link assumes an albedo of 0.24 – derived from 8 Flora the parent body of the Flora family – and calculates a diameter of 1.05 kilometers based on an absolute magnitude of 17.07.

References

External links 
 Asteroid Lightcurve Database (LCDB), query form (info )
 Dictionary of Minor Planet Names, Google books
 Discovery Circumstances: Numbered Minor Planets (120001)-(125000) – Minor Planet Center
 
 

120375
Discoveries by Claudine Rinner
Named minor planets
20050810